Sahan Jayawardene (full name Mathsahan Liyanajayawardene; born 25 July 1990) is a Sri Lankan cricketer. He is a left-handed batsman and left-arm medium-fast bowler who plays for Sri Lanka Air Force Sports Club. He was born in Mahamodara.

Jayawardene, who made his cricketing debut for the Under-23s team in 2009, in both the two-day and one-day form of the game, made his List A debut for the side during the 2009-10 Premier Limited Overs Tournament season, against Panadura Sports Club. He scored 2 runs with the bat, and conceded 22 runs from eight overs with the ball.

External links
Sahan Jayawardene at CricketArchive  

1990 births
Living people
Sri Lankan cricketers
Sri Lanka Air Force Sports Club cricketers